Cheng Heng (10 January 1917 – 15 March 1996) was a Cambodian politician, who was the country's Head of State from 1970–1972, and was a relatively prominent political figure during the Khmer Republic period (1970–1975).

Early life 
Heng was born into an ethnic Chinese family in Takéo. He went on to become a prosperous businessman and landowner. He served in the civil service of colonial Cambodia, eventually reaching the grade of Oudom-Montrey (senior grade colonial bureaucrat) by the mid-1950s.

Political career

His early political career, during the period when Prince Norodom Sihanouk's Sangkum party controlled the country, is relatively obscure: he entered politics in 1958, and served as Secretary of State for Agriculture in 1961-2. He was elected as the Sangkum deputy for Takhmau in 1962, but lost in the 1966 elections to a rival candidate, a young Sihanoukist doctor called Keo Sann. Heng subsequently returned via a 1967 by-election in Phnom Penh, and by 1970 was serving as President of Cambodia's National Assembly. Heng's levels of political support appear to have been limited up until 1970; aside from being President of the Assembly, he had previously been director of the main Phnom Penh prison.

Immediately subsequent to the Cambodian coup of 1970, in which the Prime Minister and Deputy Prime Minister, General Lon Nol and Prince Sisowath Sirik Matak, engineered Sihanouk's removal, Heng was made Head of State until elections could be arranged. This was a largely ceremonial role, as Lon Nol had assumed most of the Head of State's political powers on an emergency basis: Sihanouk, from exile, was to dismiss Heng as an "insignificant puppet".

Apart from giving press conferences, President Cheng Heng was also called on to receive visiting foreign politicians: William Shawcross relates an incident during Spiro Agnew's July 1970 visit to Phnom Penh, in which that President Cheng Heng was forced to contend with United States Secret Service personnel training their guns on him while he was attempting to welcome Agnew to the Royal Palace.

Nol subsequently used a political crisis to remove President Cheng Heng from power and take over the role himself early in 1972. In 1973, after American pressure on Lon Nol to broaden political involvement, Heng was made Vice-Chairman of a 'High Political Council' set up to govern the country. The Council's influence was soon, however, sidelined, and Nol resumed personalist rule of the deteriorating Republic.

In 1975, with the Khmer Rouge forces surrounding the capital, Heng's name was published on a list of "Seven Traitors" (also including Lon Nol, Sisowath Sirik Matak, In Tam, Long Boret, Sosthene Fernandez and Son Ngoc Thanh) who were threatened with immediate execution in the event of a Communist victory. Heng fled the country on April 1 for Paris, where he became associated with the group of exiles centred on Son Sann.

Heng returned to Cambodia after the UN-brokered 1991 political settlement (the Paris Peace Agreements) and had some further involvement in politics, founding the Republican Coalition Party which unsuccessfully took part in the 1993 elections. 

He died on 15 March 1996 at the age of 86 in Portland, Oregon, the United States.

Other activities 
 World Academy of Art and Science, Fellow

References

Sources

Corfield, J. Khmers Stand Up! A History of the Cambodian Government, 1970-1975, Monash Asia Institute, 1994
梁明 (Liang, Ming)， "高棉華僑概況 (Overview of the Khmer Chinese)–海外華人青少年叢書"， 1988, 华侨协会总会主编–正中书局印行
Shawcross, W. Sideshow: Kissinger, Nixon, and the Destruction of Cambodia, Simon & Schuster, 1979
Norodom Sihanouk, My War with the CIA, Random House, 1973

 

20th-century Cambodian politicians 
Members of the National Assembly (Cambodia)
Presidents of the National Assembly (Cambodia)
People of the Vietnam War
Cambodian anti-communists
Cambodian people of Chinese descent
1910 births
1996 deaths
Khmer Republic 
Government ministers of Cambodia
Heads of state of Cambodia